August Wilhelm Heinrich Blasius (5 July 1845 in Braunschweig – 31 May 1912 in Braunschweig) was a German ornithologist.

Blasius belonged to a family of scientists: his father was the ornithologist Johann Heinrich Blasius (1809-1870) and his brother was the ornithologist Rudolf Heinrich Paul Blasius (1842-1907).

In 1871 he became a professor of zoology and botany at the Braunschweig University of Technology. He also served as director of its natural history museum and botanical gardens. He was a member of the council for the Deutsche Ornithologen-Gesellschaft (German Ornithological Society).

Selected writings 
 Beiträge zur Kenntniss der Vogelfauna von Borneo, 1881 (with Adolph Nehrkorn) - Contribution to the knowledge of birds from Borneo.
 Dr. Platen's ornithologische Sammlungen aus Amboina, 1882 (with Adolf Nehrkorn) - Dr. Platen's ornithological collection from Amboina.
 Über die letzten Vorkommnisse des Riesen-Alks (Alca impennis), 1883 - On the last occurrences of the great auk (Alca impennis). 
 Ueber einige Vögel von Cochabamba in Bolivia, 1885 - On some birds of Cochabamba in Bolivia.
 Beiträge zur Kenntniss der Vogelfauna von Celebes, 1885 - Contribution to the knowledge of birds from the Celebes.
 Die Vögel von Gross-Sanghir, 1888 - Birds of Greater Sanghir.
 Die anthropologische litteratur Braunschweigs und der nachbargebiete, 1900 - Anthropological literature of Braunschweig and neighboring areas.

References
Beolens, Bo & Watkins, Michael (2003). Whose Bird?: Men and women commemorated in the common names of birds, Christopher Helm, London.

German ornithologists
1845 births
1912 deaths
Scientists from Braunschweig
People from the Duchy of Brunswick
Academic staff of the Technical University of Braunschweig
19th-century German zoologists